Tokyo 17th district is a constituency of the House of Representatives in the Diet of Japan (national legislature). It is located in eastern mainland Tokyo and covers northeastern parts of the former city of Tokyo. The district consists of Katsushika and parts of Edogawa ward. As of 2012, 440,965 eligible voters were registered in the district.

Before the electoral reform of 1994, Katsushika, Edogawa and Adachi had been part of Tokyo 10th district where five Representatives were elected by single non-transferable vote.

The only representative for the 17th district since its creation has been Katsuei Hirasawa (LDP, Yamasaki faction), former Vice Minister in the Cabinet Office and former Chairman of the House of Representatives Committee on Foreign Affairs.

List of representatives

Election results

References 

Districts of the House of Representatives (Japan)
Politics of Tokyo